Mount Lincoln is a  mountain within the Franconia Range of the White Mountains of New Hampshire. Lincoln is located between Little Haystack and Mount Lafayette.  All three overlook Franconia Notch. The west side of Lincoln drains into the main stem of the Pemigewasset River. The east side drains into Lincoln Brook, thence into the Franconia Branch of the Pemigewasset.

The Appalachian Trail, a  National Scenic Trail from Georgia to Maine, traverses Franconia Ridge, including Lincoln.

See also 

 Four-thousand footers
 White Mountains Region
 List of mountains in New Hampshire

References

External links
 "Hiking Mount Lincoln". Appalachian Mountain Club.
  "Mt. Lincoln". HikeTheWhites.com:

Mountains of New Hampshire
Mountains of Grafton County, New Hampshire
Mountains on the Appalachian Trail